Aira cupaniana (Silver Hairgrass) is a species of annual herb in the family True grasses. They have a self-supporting growth form and simple, broad leaves. Individuals can grow to 13 cm.

Sources

References 

Flora of Malta